Christopher v. SmithKline Beecham Corp., 567 U.S. 142 (2012), is a US labor law case of the United States Supreme Court. It held that pharmaceutical sales representatives were not eligible for overtime pay. The court ruled in a majority opinion written by Justice Samuel Alito that sales representatives were classified as "outside salesmen" who are exempt from the Department of Labor's regulations regarding overtime pay.

Facts
Michael Christopher and Frank Buchanan worked for GlaxoSmithKline, and claimed overtime pay under the Fair Labor Standards Act. They argued they were employees under 29 USC § 207(a), while GSK contended they were acting ‘in the capacity of outside salesman’ under § 213(a). In turn 29 C.F.R. § 541.500 defined ‘outside salesman’ as ‘any employee’ whose duty was ‘making sales’ under § 203(k) which said that included ‘any sale, exchange, contract to sell’ and so on. Christopher and Buchanan were sales representatives for around four years from 2003, who marketed to physicians to buy the company's products. They spent 40 hours a week calling physicians, and another 10 to 20 hours attending events and performing other miscellaneous tasks. Their pay included a salary and bonus pay, based on performance in selling. In a class action lawsuit, they sought time and a half for over 40 hours work.

The United States District Court for the District of Arizona granted a judgment in favor of GlaxoSmithKline. After the Department of Labor filed an amicus in a related case in the Second Circuit, they appealed to the United States Court of Appeals for the Ninth Circuit in California, which affirmed the lower court's decision. The plaintiffs then appealed to the Supreme Court.

Judgment
Supreme Court held, by a five to four majority, that Christopher and Buchanan were not entitled to overtime pay under the Fair Labor Standards Act, because they were effecting sales within the Act's exception in § 213(a). Justice Alito delivered the opinion of the court, in which Chief Justice Roberts, and Justices Scalia, Kennedy and Thomas joined.

Justice Breyer filed a dissenting opinion, in which Justices Ginsburg, Sotomayor and Kagan joined.

See also

US labor law

References

External links
 

United States Supreme Court cases
United States Supreme Court cases of the Roberts Court
United States labor case law
2012 in United States case law
GSK plc litigation